Lucy Davenport is a British actress who graduated at the Royal Academy of Dramatic Art in 1999.

Filmography

Film

Television

References

External links

Living people
British film actresses
British television actresses
Place of birth missing (living people)
Year of birth missing (living people)
21st-century British actresses
Alumni of RADA